Social Animals is a 2018 American comedy film, written and directed by Theresa Bennett in her directorial debut. It stars Noël Wells, Josh Radnor, Aya Cash, Carly Chaikin, Fortune Feimster and Samira Wiley.

The film was released in a limited release and through video on demand on June 1, 2018, by Paramount Pictures.

Plot
Zoe is an almost 30-year-old woman who owns an unsuccessful waxing business on the same street as Paul's adult video store. She lives in a tiny home on her landlord's land, however is unable to pay her rent in a timely manner. She takes a Polaroid of every person that she has sex with.

Paul's marriage is struggling. His wife, Jane, is a serious lawyer and supports their family. They haven't had sex in three months, and she suggests that he have an affair, leaving him confused and he rejects the suggestion.

Zoe attends a friend, Lana's, wedding, and sees Paul there. The pair later meet when she goes into his store. Paul expresses interest in the concept of an affair to Jane after meeting Zoe. Jane also attempts to have different sexual rendezvous but each of them ends with her getting emotional and crying.

Zoe meets Paul after attending Lana's baby shower, but is overwhelmed by the fact that he has three kids and has sex with the bartender there. Jane and Paul continue to have moments that appear to be periods of sexual reconciliation, however Jane backs out each time. Paul and Zoe continue to see each other and build a rapport, eventually having sex. Zoe's best friend Claire points out that Zoe waited especially longer to sleep with him than she usually does. After having sex, Zoe reflects on the fact that he has three kids and a wife and feels baited by him. He consoles her, however she remains conflicted.

Jane goes by Zoe's store to book a waxing appointment out of curiosity, after feeling as though she is the one that Paul is sleeping with. She is passive and reveals that Lana and her husband are already having problems and that he has been cheating on her. Jane breaks down crying, and reveals that she has been having panic attacks regularly. She's embarrassed and quickly leaves after the appointment is finished.

Some time later, Lana has given birth to a baby, and she invites Zoe, Paul, Jane, Claire, and Claire's fiancé Justin over for dinner. Paul makes aggressive comments about Jane's parenting advice, creating tension and awkwardness. Jane responds with comments on Paul's work ethic and how he is not the primary provider for the family. Following the dinner, Zoe ends all contact with Paul. Jane later reveals to Paul that she paid someone to have sex with her.

After their son goes missing, Jane and Paul unveil their frustrations on each other. Jane says she feels as though she did her best and is disappointed in her “shitty wife” reputation. Paul snaps back, saying that her honesty is just a way for her to hurt people.

Zoe decides to view life more optimistically and hosts an event to promote her business. After riling the crowd up, they go to smash the window of her biggest competitor but she's promptly arrested. Claire bails her out, but is frustrated with Zoe's irresponsibility, especially after Zoe doesn't have a plan to pay Claire back for the bail. She tells her to grow up and stop reveling in her own pity party.

Paul moves out of his home with Jane and the lease on his store ends as well. Zoe gets her job back at Beer Land and pays Claire back and the two reconcile their friendship. Paul plans an elaborate night to reconcile with Zoe and is successful. The pair begin dating again. Jane moves into a new apartment with the kids and decides to let loose more and live according to her own standards versus everyone else's.

The film ends with each character having found more comfort in themselves and more confidence in their relationships.

Cast
 Noël Wells as Zoe
 Josh Radnor as Paul
 Aya Cash as Jane
 Carly Chaikin as Claire
 Fortune Feimster as Sarah-Beth
 Samira Wiley as Lana
 Adam Shapiro as Justin
 Rico LeBron as Fernando

Production
In September 2016, it was announced Noël Wells, Josh Radnor, Aya Cash, Fortune Feimster and Carly Chaikin had been cast in the film, with Theresa Bennett directing, from a screenplay she wrote. Ash Christian, Melodie Sick, Coleman Lannum, Mark L. Lester, will produce the film under their Cranium Entertainment, BondIt, and Titan Global banners, respectively, while Mason Novick, Michelle Knudsen, Jeff Sackman, Berry Meyerowitz, Matthew Helderman, Luke Dylan Taylor, Sean Patrick O’Reilly, Jon Wroblewski and Summer Finley will serve as executive producers. In October 2016, Samira Wiley joined the cast of the film.

Principal photography began in September 2016, in Austin, Texas.

Release

The film was released in a limited release and through video on demand on June 1, 2018, by Paramount Pictures.

Critical reception
Social Animals received mixed reviews from film critics. On Metacritic, the film holds a rating of 37 out of 100, based on four critics, indicating "generally unfavorable reviews".

References

External links
 

2018 films
American comedy films
American independent films
Films shot in Austin, Texas
Paramount Pictures films
2018 directorial debut films
2018 comedy films
2018 independent films
2010s English-language films
2010s American films